The olive montane mouse (Aepeomys lugens) is a species of rodent in the family Cricetidae.
It is found in Ecuador and Venezuela.

References

Aepeomys
Mammals described in 1896
Taxa named by Oldfield Thomas
Taxonomy articles created by Polbot